Frank Zabriskie was an American-born Scottish astronomer and an Elected Fellow of the American Association for the Advancement of Science, elected in 1962.

References 

Fellows of the American Association for the Advancement of Science
American astronomers
Scottish astronomers
1933 births
2021 deaths